Amy Alkon (born March 8, 1964), also known as the Advice Goddess, writes a weekly advice column, Ask the Advice Goddess, which is published in over 100 newspapers within North America. While Alkon addresses a wide range of topics, she primarily focuses on issues in intimate relationships. Her columns are based largely on evolutionary psychology.

Life and career
Alkon grew up in Farmington Hills, a wealthy suburb of Detroit, Michigan. She identifies as a weak atheist. Alkon credits her isolation as the catalyst that cultivated her early fondness for reading.

Alkon moved to New York City, where she dispensed advice on a street corner in SoHo as one of three women who called themselves "The Advice Ladies." This was not an occupation, merely a hobby, and their setup was minimal, using only folding chairs and a handmade sign advertising "Free Advice from a Panel of Experts". She co-authored a book, Free Advice - The Advice Ladies on Love, Dating, Sex, and Relationships with her fellow "Advice Ladies," Caroline Johnson and Marlowe Minnick. Her next book, a solo project entitled I See Rude People: One Woman’s Battle to Beat Some Manners Into Impolite Society, was released in November, 2009, and was published by McGraw Hill.

Before billing herself as the "advice goddess," Alkon wrote Ask Amy Alkon, an advice column published solely in the New York Daily News.

In 2004, the Biography Channel featured Alkon in a series of one-minute shorts called "The Advice Minute With Amy Alkon."  There were 11 in total and during these segments, which ran between the Biography Channel's regular programs, Alkon dispensed advice on the streets of New York, just as she had done with her cohorts years earlier.

In 2011, Alkon was threatened with a defamation suit with damages of half a million US dollars by a TSA agent who Alkon alleges forced the side of her gloved hand into Alkon's vagina four times through her underwear. The agent, Thedala Magee, claimed that describing such an act as 'rape' constituted defamation, and that Alkon had described her as a 'bad person' for behaving in such a manner.  She was defended by First Amendment attorney Marc Randazza. 

In a second incident, in November 2012, Alkon complained that a TSA agent "ran her hands, most disgustingly, all over my body, grazing my labia and touching my breasts and inside my turtleneck on my bare skin."

Campaigns
Issues she has written and spoken of are unruly children, the behavior of which she attributes to bad parenting, inconsiderate cellphone users, and copyright violators.

Further reading

Alkon, Amy; Johnson, Caroline; Minnick, Marlowe (1996). Free Advice: The Advice Ladies on Love, Dating, Sex and Relationships. Dell Publishing

References

External links
Official Website

American advice columnists
Jewish advice columnists
American women columnists
Jewish American writers
Living people
Jewish American atheists
People from Farmington Hills, Michigan
1964 births
University of Michigan alumni
Journalists from New York City